Jordan competed at the 2016 Summer Olympics in Rio de Janeiro, Brazil, from 5 to 21 August 2016. This was the nation's tenth consecutive appearance at the Summer Olympics.

The Jordan Olympic Committee selected a team of eight athletes, seven men and one woman, to compete in six sports at the Games. The nation's roster in Rio de Janeiro was also a replication to those sent to Sydney 2000 and Athens 2004, respectively, but had the highest percentage of men in its Olympic history since 1984. Among the sports represented by the athletes, Jordan made its Olympic debut in triathlon.

The Jordanian team featured two returning athletes from London 2012: Methkal Abu Drais in men's marathon, and Talita Baqlah, who became the first swimmer to attend two Olympic Games, along with her younger brother Khader. Meanwhile, super heavyweight boxer Hussein Ishaish was chosen by the committee to carry the Jordanian flag in the opening ceremony.

Jordan left Rio de Janeiro with its first ever Olympic gold medal, and the first medal of any color since the 1992 Olympics in Barcelona. It was won by taekwondo fighter Ahmad Abu-Ghaush in the men's featherweight category.

Medallists

Athletics
 
Jordanian athletes have so far achieved qualifying standards in the following athletics events (up to a maximum of 3 athletes in each event):

Track & road events

Boxing

Jordan has entered two boxers to compete in each of the following classes into the Olympic boxing tournament. Super heavyweight boxer Hussein Ishaish claimed his Olympic spot with a box-off victory at the 2016 Asia & Oceania Qualification Tournament in Qian'an, China. Meanwhile, Obada Al-Kasbeh received an invitation from the Tripartite Commission to compete in the men's light welterweight division.

Judo

Jordan has qualified one judoka for the men's middleweight category (90 kg) at the Games, signifying the nation's Olympic debut in the sport. Ibrahim Khalaf earned a continental quota spot from the Asian region, as the highest-ranked Jordanian judoka outside of direct qualifying position in the IJF World Ranking List of May 30, 2016.

Swimming

Jordan has received a Universality invitation from FINA to send two swimmers (one male and one female) to the Olympics.

Taekwondo
 
Jordan entered one athlete into the taekwondo competition at the Olympics. Ahmad Abu-Ghaush secured a spot in the men's lightweight category (68 kg) by virtue of his top two finish at the 2016 Asian Qualification Tournament in Manila, Philippines.

Triathlon
 
Jordan has entered one triathlete to compete at the Games, signifying the nation's Olympic debut in the sport. Lawrence Fanous was awarded a tripartite commission invitation for the men's event.

References

External links 

 

Olympics
2016
Nations at the 2016 Summer Olympics